Taylor Perry (born 15 July 2001) is an English footballer who plays as a midfielder for Cheltenham Town, on loan from Wolverhampton Wanderers.

Career
Born in Stourbridge, Perry made his first team debut for Wolverhampton Wanderers, whose academy he had progressed from, on 25 September 2019 as a substitute in an EFL Cup victory against Reading. He had been part of the club's pre-season tour of China, where he played in the Premier League Asia Trophy Final against Manchester City and scored in Wolves' penalty shootout victory.

On 5 August 2021 it was announced that Perry had signed a season-long loan at Cheltenham Town. In his sixth appearance for Cheltenham (fifth in League One), Perry scored his first senior professional goal, and his debut goal for Cheltenham, in a 2–1 away win against Charlton Athletic on 11 September 2021. Having suffered an injury in October 2021, he was recalled by Wolves for treatment in January 2022.

On 14 July 2022, Perry returned to Cheltenham Town for another season on loan.

Career statistics

References

External links

2001 births
Living people
English footballers
Sportspeople from Stourbridge
Footballers from the West Midlands (county)
Association football midfielders
Cheltenham Town F.C. players
Wolverhampton Wanderers F.C. players
English Football League players